Tatyana Titova (born 6 August 1965) is a retired long-distance runner from Russia who has won eleven marathons during her career. Her personal best of 2:29:36 was set during her victory at the 2004 San Diego Rock 'n' Roll Marathon.

Titova is a three-time winner of the Columbus Marathon (1996, 1999, 2001) and a two-time winner of the California International Marathon (2002, 2003). She has also won a number of other marathons including the Paris Marathon (1992), the Hartford Marathon (1999), the Austin Marathon (2000), the Green Bay Marathon (2002), and the Gasparilla Distance Classic Marathon (2007).

Achievements

References

External links
 IAAF profile
  Profile

1965 births
Living people
Russian female long-distance runners
Russian female marathon runners
Paris Marathon female winners